Corbio was an ancient town of Latium in central Italy.

In around 488 BC, Corbio was captured by an invading army of the Volsci, led by Gaius Marcius Coriolanus and Attius Tullus Aufidius.

References

Geography of Italy